Mikhail Pavlovich Ogonkov (24 June 1932 in Moscow – 14 August 1979, Moscow) was a Russian footballer of the 1950s and 1960s. He played as a left-back for Spartak Moscow. According to the footballer Nikita Simonyan Mikhail Ogonkov was the best Soviet Full Back of all times

Ogonkov was a member of the USSR team that won the 1956 Olympic gold medal. His main attributes were his positioning, exceptional fitness and strong tackling.

In 1958 he was arrested, along with Eduard Streltsov and Boris Tatushin, over an alleged rape. The resulting indefinite ban later reduced to three-year ban from football deprived him of playing at his peak. Soon after his return from suspension in 1961 he was badly injured (his kidney was removed) and forced to retire from playing football. He then worked as a children coach in Spartak Moscow.

In 1979 his dead body was found in his Moscow apartment apparently two weeks after the death. The cause of the death was not properly investigated although murder was rumored.

References

1932 births
1979 deaths
FC Spartak Moscow players
Russian footballers
Soviet footballers
Soviet Union international footballers
Olympic footballers of the Soviet Union
Footballers at the 1956 Summer Olympics
Olympic gold medalists for the Soviet Union
Olympic medalists in football
Medalists at the 1956 Summer Olympics
Association football defenders